Raja Hindu Rao was a Maratha nobleman, the brother-in-law of Maharaja Daulat Rao Scindia of Gwalior, and the brother of Baiza Bai, the regent of the Indian princely state of Gwalior. Following the Revolt of 1857, he shifted to Delhi where he was on friendly terms with the British Resident. According to Emily Eden, sister of the then Governor General of India, Lord Auckland:  "On a Revolution at Gwatia he retired to Delhi, where he now principally resides, and where he is well known in European society, with which he is fond of Mixing. Hindoo Rao is a very constant attendant on the person of the Governor-General  wherever he may be in the neighbourhood of Delhi; making a point, generally, of joining his suite and riding with him on his morning marches." His residence was a scene of a major battle in Delhi during the Revolt of 1857 and has long since been converted into the Hindu Rao Hospital, a well known Government hospital in Malka Ganj, North Delhi.

See also
Scindia
Gwalior State
Maratha
Maratha Empire

References

External links
 Online Gallery British Library

Indian  people of the Indian Rebellion of 1857
People from Gwalior
Indian royalty